Science tourism is a travel topic grouping scientific attractions. It covers interests in visiting and exploring scientific landmarks, including museums, laboratories, observatories and universities. It also includes visits to see events of scientific interest, such as solar eclipses.

A laboratory is a workplace and many have ongoing scientific research. They may not be open to the general public, or may only offer occasional special opportunities for public access. Many observatories are open to the public at regular hours, and have tours showcasing their astronomical research.

Museums

Europe

Northern Europe
 Nobel Museum   It has exhibitions about the Nobel Prize.

 Sweden Solar System in greater Stockholm, contains the world's largest scale model of the Solar System.
 Heureka in Vantaa is an interactive science museum, with different kinds of exhibitions about technology, physics, chemistry, medicine, astronomy and so on. Really exciting for children interested in science.

Central Europe

 Peenemünde – A place where the Germans developed some of the world's first rockets before and during WW2.

 Marie Curie Museum– History of radioactivity

 Auto & Technik Museum in Sinsheim, Baden-Württemberg (southwestern Germany). Has interesting displays of many vintage and historic cars, motorcycles, other machinery, and an extensive collection of aircraft, including a Soviet Tu 144 and French/Britain Concorde.

 Deutsches Museum – A museum of "everything technology" and more.  A scientific and technical museum and one of the most important sights in the Munich area, visited by roughly 1.5 million visitors per year.  Topics include brewing, computer sciences and bridge building.  There are guided tours on specific themes and in different languages.  There is a planetarium and two branch offices in other locations, which show vehicles that found no place in downtown Munich.

 Zeppelin Museum in the city of Friedrichshafen offers a museum dedicated to zeppelins, and another to Dornier aircraft.

Western Europe
 Science Museum London

 The Down House – Charles Darwin lived here when he worked out the theory of evolution by natural selection.  Darwin wrote 'On the Origin of Species' in this house. The house has also carnivorous plants and exotic orchids.

 James Clerk Maxwell's Birthplace and Museum – Edinburgh's answer to Newton and Einstein.  His equations unified the forces of Electricity and Magnetism and paved the way for Einstein's theory of special relativity.   Modern technology in electricity and electronics, derive from Maxwell's discovery of the laws of the electromagnetic field, bringing a fundamental change in concept that influenced greatly the modern scientific and industrial revolution."

Southern Europe
 Leonardo da Vinci Museum of Science and Technology – Located in Milan. As the name tells, it is a museum to learn more about science and technology. Hosted in a former monastery, San Vittore al Corpo.

 South Tyrol Museum of Archaeology

Eastern Europe
 Memorial Museum of Cosmonautics in the outskirts of Moscow there are a couple of sites dedicated to the Soviet and Russian contributions to science and technology. These include the Memorial Museum of Cosmonautics, the All-Russia Exhibition Centre and the Monument to the Conquerors of Space. 
 Akademgorodok – Out in the Siberian taiga near Novosibirsk, Akademgorodok (literally "academy town") was built during the Soviet era, so that the academic elite could conduct their research in relative freedom, prosperity, and isolation. The planned city with tree lined streets hosts several museums, institutes, as well as a beach on the Ob Sea, an artificial reservoir.

North America
 Exploratorium in San Francisco
 Kennedy Space Center in Cape Canaveral - The launch site for NASA's space missions. All 12 persons who have traveled to the Moon so far have started their journeys from here.
 National Air and Space Museum in Washington, D.C.
 National Museum of Mathematics or MoMath in New York
 National Museum of Natural History in Washington, D.C.
 Space Center Houston in Webster, Texas - NASA space museum, plus tram tours of Johnson Space Center, including astronaut training facilities, Mission Control, and the actual Apollo and Mercury launch vehicles.
 Ontario Science Centre in Toronto - Canada's first and largest Science Centre

Oceania
 Powerhouse Museum – The Powerhouse Museum is a large museum, essentially of popular culture. It has displays on the history of fashion and transport, decorative arts, music, and space exploration exhibits. It also partly plays on a sci-tech theme, with interactive hands-on and discovery displays of technology, design and industry There is usually a special exhibition on as well. There are in-depth displays for all ages, but also displays especially created for young children to discover and play.

 Questacon – an interactive museum of science with exhibits illustrating scientific ideas from the principles of physics to the motion of an earthquake. Great for kids and excellent science books can be picked up here. Allow at least half a day.

South America
 Alcântara in Northeast Brazil, is the rocket launch site for the Brazilian Space Agency, and hosts a museum on the site
 Kourou in French Guiana hosts the Guyana Space Centre, the primary rocket launch site for the European Space Agency.
 Gold Museum in Bogotá, Colombia
 The Archeology Museum in Bogotá, Colombia
 Casa Marqués de San Jorge in Bogotá, Colombia

Laboratories

Europe
Many European countries participate on the European Organization for Nuclear Research, which has his laboratories including the famous Large Hadron Collider on the French/Swiss border. Plus the bigger European countries like France, Germany, Italy and UK operate national laboratories. Most laboratories have open days for public visits.

 Commissariat à l'énergie atomique et aux énergies alternatives – The CEA has 5 divisions: nuclear energy, technological research, life sciences, sciences of matter and military applications. It has one of the top 100 supercomputers in the world, the Tera-100.

 CEA Saclay – The biggest research center of the CEA hosts nuclear research reactors.

 CERN – the European Organization for Nuclear Research, physicists and engineers are probing the fundamental structure of the universe. The Large Hadron Collider (LHC) is the world's largest experiment and most complex scientific accelerator. Founded in 1954, the CERN laboratory sits astride the Franco-Swiss border near Geneva. The weak force got discovered here in 1973 and in 1983 subsequently the W and Z bosons. In 1995 it created the first Anti-Hydrogen atoms of which the ASACUSA experiment can since 2014 produce a beam of. In 2012 the ATLAS and CMS experiment announced the discovery of a boson with 125 GeV, whose properties got confirmed to be the long-sought Higgs boson.

 Microcosm – In front of the entrance of the CERN laboratory there is a permanent exposition retracing its history.

 CERN Guided Tours – Both as individual or as group it is possible from time to time to visit the experiments.

 DESY (Hamburg)
 FAIR
 Gran Sasso
 National Physical Laboratory – the birthplace of atomic timekeeping. In the 1950s, Louis Essen and John Parry constructed the atomic clock, Caesium Mk. 1. This new clock kept time more accurately. It paved the way for redefining the second in 1967, based on the fundamental properties of CS atoms, rather than the quite irregular Earth rotation. The facilities in Teddington are among the world's most extensive and sophisticated for measurement science. On 20 May 2014, NPL Open House will give people the chance to explore much of the science that goes on at NPL and the facilities that are used to do it: NPL Open House 2014. While children are allowed, the exhibits are aimed for adults, and children must be kept under adult supervision at all times.

 Rutherford Appleton Laboratory – a national scientific research laboratories in the UK operated by the Science and Technology Facilities Council. It is a multidisciplinary centre for research both in physical and life sciences. It had in 1957 a 50 MeV proton linear accelerator. RAL hosts ISIS, a spallation neutron source and the Central Laser Facility. RAL organises a monthly public scientific lecture: Talking Science.

North America

DOE Laboratories
In the United States of America overseen by the United States Department of Energy (DOE) the Office of science operates ten national laboratories. In total there are 17 national laboratories funded by the DOE. Most of the sites hold open houses where the public can come in for free and see how American tax dollars are invested in research. This used to include nuclear facilities, but those have been restricted since 9/11.
 Ames Laboratory – conducts research into various areas, including the synthesis and study of new materials, energy resources, high-speed computer design, and environmental cleanup and restoration. The Ames Project purpose was to produce high purity uranium for the Manhattan Project.  Its most notable faculty member Dan Shechtman won the 2011 Chemistry Nobel prize.  Individual visits and group tours can be arranged through the public affairs office.

 Argonne National Laboratory – founded in 1946 to carry out Enrico Fermi's work on nuclear reactors as part of the Manhattan Project.  Today Argonne is a science and engineering research center.  Argonne welcomes visitors age 16 or older to take guided tours of the scientific and engineering facilities and grounds.  Tours last about two and a half hours and are by reservation only.

 Brookhaven National Laboratory – a multipurpose research institution funded primarily by the U.S. Department of Energy's Office of Science. Located on the center of Long Island, New York, Brookhaven Lab operates large-scale facilities for studies in physics, chemistry, biology, medicine and applied science. It is the home of the Relativistic Heavy Ion Collider, which first observed/created the Quark-Gluon-Plasma. Brookhaven scientists won 7 Nobel prizes including the Ribosome discovery (2009).  The lab is open to the public on Sundays during the summer for tours and special programs.

 Fermi National Accelerator Laboratory – a US Department of Energy national laboratory specializing in high-energy particle physics. Hence many components of the Large Hadron Collider got engineered and tested here. The Top quark was discovered in 1995 by both the CDF and DØ experiments of the Tevatron accelerator at Fermilab. The 2008 Nobel prize was given for the prediction of the third generation of quarks (Bottom and Top quarks). Fermilab visitors are allowed to visit two buildings on their own: the first and ground floor of Wilson Hall and the Lederman Science Center, Groups of six or more must book a visit by calling the center.

 Lawrence Berkeley National Laboratory – founded in 1931 by Ernest Orlando Lawrence. 13 Nobel prizes have been awarded to LBNL scientists, the most recent one (2011) for the discovery of the accelerated expansion of the Universe. It started as a particle physics laboratory, became involved for the study of nuclear matter and discovered 16 chemical elements. It is today a multi-program research site. Visitors need special clearance or may take advantage of the open days. The site on top of the hill nicely overlooks the San Francisco Bay.

 Oak Ridge National Laboratory – a multiprogram science and energy laboratory, with scientific and technical capabilities spanning from basic to applied research. ORNL is famous to host the Titan supercomputer. The Spallation Neutron Source is an accelerator-based neutron source facility that provides the most intense pulsed neutron beams in the world for scientific research and industrial development. Oak Ridge National Laboratory hosts thousands of visitors every year. It is very important, if you are not a DOE or DOE contractor employee, to arrange your visit to ORNL ahead of time.

 Pacific Northwest National Laboratory – has many research projects for the U.S. Department of Homeland Security and the National Nuclear Security Administration. All PNNL visitors, regardless of nationality, will need to have visitor badges to go past the Lobby.

 Princeton Plasma Physics Laboratory – researches plasma physics and nuclear fusion science. PPPL is located on Princeton University's Forrestal Campus. The free tours are led by engineers and physicists who can answer questions about magnetic fusion. In order to visit email to request a tour and give PPPL two weekdays when you would like to visit and some background on your group, including where your group is from, how many people are in your group, the age-range and the educational background of your group.

 SLAC National Accelerator Laboratory – does experimental and theoretical research in elementary particle physics using electron beams and a broad program of research in atomic and solid-state physics, chemistry, biology, and medicine using synchrotron radiation. It discovered the charm quark, the quark structure inside the protons and neutrons and the tau lepton (3 Nobel prizes). At this time, all public and educational tours of the laboratory have been suspended. SLAC hopes to have them back and asks to check their website periodically for updates.

 Thomas Jefferson National Accelerator Facility – the Continuous Electron Beam Accelerator Facility, which is 1400m in length and accelerates electrons up to 6 GeV. The most powerful free-electron laser in the world has an output of over 14 kilowatts. The lab has an open house once a year that includes a tour of the accelerator tunnel and the free electron laser. No registration of visitors is required during the open house. The open house tours involve extended periods of walking, and many tour stops include stairs. Also, much of the event is outdoors.

Other Laboratories
 Biosphere 2 – designed as an artificially closed complete ecology, and was the setting for research on human interaction with natural systems. The site is now owned and maintained by the University of Arizona, which conducts tours for the public. Beware that the scientific credentials of the initial project phase are quite unclear as it started as theatre group. For example, no input was taken from the Antarctic research stations, where researchers experienced extreme confinement.

Observatories

Europe
 ESO Supernova Planetarium & Visitor Centre – is an astronomy centre for the public located at the site of ESO Headquarters in Garching near Munich.
 European Space Agency's Columbus Control Centre – used to control the Columbus research laboratory of the International Space Station, as well as a ground control centre for the Galileo satellite navigation system. It is located at a large research facility of the German Aerospace Centre. (DLR).

 Stjerneborg observatory on Hven Island, Sweden - Tycho Brahe's observatory.

 University Observatory Vienna – The Institute of Astronomy is part of the University of Vienna, located inside a fabulous historic building. The building and the Sternwartepark were closed for visitors up until recently. The park contains many rare trees. It has a mini observatory on the roof. Guided tours are available.

North America
 Mt Graham International Observatory – Operated by the University of Arizona and situated in the Pinaleño Mountains west of Safford, this observatory offers periodic tours for the public. Reservations required, preferably two or more weeks in advance. Tours depart from the Discovery Park Campus in Safford.

 Kitt Peak National Observatory – Operates several astronomical telescopes plus a large solar telescope. Several guided tours are available, as well as a nightly observation program (reservations required).

 McDonald Observatory

 Fred Lawrence Whipple Observatory – Call ahead for tour information.

 Lowell Observatory – Among other historical achievements, this is the observatory where Clyde Tombaugh discovered Pluto, and you can still see the telescope he used to do it.

 NRAO Very Large Array – Huge, iconic radio telescope array featured in numerous films and TV shows, which still performs cutting edge observations. Self-guided tour allows you to walk around the base of one of the dishes and see into the maintenance facility. Occasional guided tours (see website) give you a closer look.

 Green Bank Observatory – Tucked away in the beautiful West Virginia Mountains, in the middle of the National Radio Quiet Zone, the Robert C. Byrd Green Bank Telescope is the largest fully steerable single dish radio telescope in the world.

South America

While the headquarters of the European Southern Observatory are in Garching near Munich, Germany the observatories are located in northern Chile.

 European Southern Observatory
 La Silla Observatory, Atacama Desert, Coquimbo Region, Chile.
 Paranal Observatory, Cerro Paranal, Chile.
 Atacama Large Millimeter Array/submillimeter Array, Llano de Chajnantor, Chile.

Africa

South Africa 
 Southern African Large Telescope – The SALT telescope is largest single optical telescope in the southern hemisphere and among the largest in the world.

 KAT-7, MeerKAT, PAPER, and SKA Africa – The SKA Telescope is the most powerful telescope ever conceived. Its precursor, MeerKAT, is already the most powerful telescope every built. Most of it is to be built in Africa under the auspices of SKA Africa.  The African precursor, MeerKAT, is already the most powerful radio telescope every built.  The core of the telescope is located near Carnarvon, on the Northern Cape, with more dishes located in Botswana, Madagascar, Mozambique, Zambia, Namibia, Mauritius and Ghana.

 South African Astronomical Observatory – The national centre for optical and infrared astronomy in South Africa.  The Observatory has a fascinating history dating back to 1820, which is when our main building was constructed, making it one of the oldest permanent structures in Cape Town.  Owing to light and air pollution in the city, most of the actual observing happens in Sutherland in the Northern Cape, about 380 km from Cape Town.  Some of the telescopes in Cape Town are still used for outreach and public events.

Namibia
 H.E.S.S. Telescope – One of the leading observatories studying very high energy (VHE) gamma-ray astrophysics.

Universities
The most prestigious universities generally attract excellent scientists and have fine science programs. University campuses are usually open to the public, though permission from guards is sometimes required, and there may be some café or cafeteria or mensa or restaurant or even a university shop on site. Universities usually offer public lectures about ongoing research. Otherwise, their seminars and buildings are reserved for the students and the working faculty including post-doctoral researchers or professors. On weekends or holidays, many universities require special permits to enter. Universities compete on a worldwide basis; hence, they are not ordered by geographical position or alphabetized.

Other

 Boltzmann's grave – The Boltzmann equation was originally formulated by Ludwig Boltzmann between 1872 and 1875. It relates the entropy S of an ideal gas to the quantity W, which is the number of microstates corresponding to a given macrostate. In the ideal gas limit it exactly corresponds to the proper thermodynamic entropy.

 Schwinger's grave – The first order correction to the fine structure constant (alpha) is engraved on Julian Schwinger's headstone at Mount Auburn Cemetery.

 Schrödinger's grave – The Schrödinger equation is a partial differential equation that describes how the quantum state of some physical system evolves with time. It was formulated in late 1925. It is inscribed above his name on his grave site.

 Hofmeyr Skull, The Hofmeyr Skull is a specimen of a 36,000-year-old skull found in the 1950s near Hofmeyr, South Africa. The samples age supports the so-called "Out of Africa" theory that modern humans evolved from Africa.
 Groote Schuur Hospital, On 3 December 1967, 53-year-old Lewis Washkansky received the first human heart transplant at Groote Schuur Hospital in Cape Town, South Africa. The procedure was performed by Christiaan Barnard.

See also

 Amateur astronomy
 Archaeological sites
 Birdwatching
 Ecotourism
 Geotourism
 Cultural landscape

 Industrial tourism
 List of astronomical observatories
 List of science museums
 Museums
 Northern lights
 Nuclear tourism
 Paleontology
 Protected areas

 Science park
 Science tourism (simple wiki)
 Solar eclipses
 Space
 Steam engine
 Volcanoes
 Urbex
 Wildlife observation

References 

  Content in this article was copied from Science tourism at Wikivoyage, which is licensed under the Creative Commons Attribution-Share Alike 3.0 (Unported) (CC-BY-SA 3.0) license.

External links 

 5 Science destinations (OpenMinds; 2017)
 8 Science destinations (Inverse; 2017)

American inventions
Russian inventions

Types of tourism